Nati, (meaning: Actress) is a Marathi film directed by Yogesh Jaadhav, inspired by Bollywood actress Jiah Khan's suicide.

Nati was produced by Nita Deokar, with actress Teja Devkar as Jiah Khan.

Cast

 Teja Devkar as Sulakshana Shinde/Resham
 Subodh Bhave as Amit Kumar
 Ajinkya Deo as Mahesh Chandorkar
 Kishori Shahane
 Kishor Kadam as Pratap Shinde
 Shashank Shende 
 Neha Joshi as Monica
 Nagesh Bhosale as Umaji Shinde

Production
The movie was shot in the locales of India. It depicts the life of an actress, her rise and fall in fame.

References

2010s Marathi-language films
2014 films
Marathi remakes of Hindi films
Indian biographical films
2010s biographical films